Miller Alejandro Bolaños Reasco (born 1 June 1990) is an Ecuadorian footballer who plays as a striker for  Ecuadorian Serie A club Emelec.

Club career

LDU Quito
Bolaños was born in Esmeraldas, and began his career in the youth ranks of Caribe Junior. In 2006, he joined Barcelona SC and made his professional debut the same year. In 2009 the promising forward was transferred to LDU Quito. On 29 August 2009 in a 4–0 win over LDU Portoviejo, Bolaños scored the 2,500th goal in LDU Quito's history. He was an important player for LDU Quito during the most glorious period of the club's history as he helped the Ecuadorian club capture the 2010 Serie A title, 2009 Copa Sudamericana, and the 2009 and 2010 Recopa Sudamericana.

Loan to Chivas USA
On 11 January 2012 it was announced that Bolaños would be joining Chivas USA in Major League Soccer, accompanying compatriot Oswaldo Minda. On 18 July, he scored his first MLS goal against the Portland Timbers at The Home Depot Center, finishing a Ryan Smith pass for the only goal of the game in the 16th minute.

Loan to Emelec
Miller joined Emelec by loan on the summer of 2013. Though Miller only played 5 league games, he won the 2013 Ecuadorian Serie A season.
Miller scored 19 league-goals in 36 games, including 2 goals in the season final match against club-rivals Barcelona SC, winning the 2014 Ecuadorian Serie A. Miller Bolaños became top scorer in the 2014 Copa Sudamericana with 5 goals. During the 2013 season he noticeably formed a successful striking partnership with Denis Stracqualursi which was known affectionately as Straq-Bol by Emelec fans. This was a play on words of Spag-Bol, the Italian pasta dish.

Grêmio
On 7 February 2016, it was confirmed that Miller would play for Grêmio.

International career
Bolaños represented Ecuador at various youth levels. He participated in the 2007 South American Under-17 Football Championship, helping Ecuador to a 5–4 victory over Brazil.

Bolaños made his debut for Ecuador on 28 March 2015 in a match against Mexico, playing all 90 minutes of the game. Three days later he went on to score his first goal, equalising in a 2–1 friendly loss to Argentina in New Jersey.

Bolaños was selected for the 2015 Copa América in Chile, his first major international tournament. In the opening game against the hosts at the Estadio Nacional, he fouled Arturo Vidal, who consequently scored the first goal of the tournament from the penalty spot as his team defeated Ecuador 2–0. In the second match, he scored from outside the penalty area, albeit in a 2–3 defeat against Bolivia. In the third match in Rancagua, he opened the scoring in a 2–1 victory over Mexico which eliminated the opponents, also setting up the second for Enner Valencia.

Career statistics

Club

International

Score and Result list Ecuador's goal tally first

Honors

Club
LDU Quito
Ecuadorian Serie A: 2010
Copa Sudamericana: 2009; runner-up: 2011
Recopa Sudamericana: 2009, 2010

Emelec
Ecuadorian Serie A: 2013, 2014, 2015

Gremio
Copa do Brasil: 2016

Individual

Ecuadorian Serie A Best Player: 2014, 2015
Ecuadorian Serie A top scorer: 2015
Ecuadorian Serie A assist leader: 2015
Copa Sudamericana top scorer: 2014, 2015

Personal life
His older brother is Álex Bolaños, also a midfielder. He too represented Barcelona and LDU among others, and played internationally for their country.

References

External links
 
 
 
  
 

1990 births
Living people
Sportspeople from Esmeraldas, Ecuador
Association football forwards
Ecuadorian footballers
Ecuador international footballers
Ecuadorian Serie A players
Liga MX players
Major League Soccer players
Chinese Super League players
Barcelona S.C. footballers
L.D.U. Quito footballers
Chivas USA players
C.S. Emelec footballers
Grêmio Foot-Ball Porto Alegrense players
Club Tijuana footballers
Shanghai Shenhua F.C. players
Chongqing Liangjiang Athletic F.C. players
Copa Libertadores-winning players
Ecuadorian expatriate footballers
Expatriate soccer players in the United States
Expatriate footballers in Brazil
Expatriate footballers in China
Expatriate footballers in Mexico
Ecuadorian expatriate sportspeople in the United States
Ecuadorian expatriate sportspeople in Brazil
Ecuadorian expatriate sportspeople in Mexico
2015 Copa América players
Copa América Centenario players